is a town located in Higashisonogi District, Nagasaki Prefecture, Japan.

As of October 1, 2021, the town has an estimated population of 13,221 and a density of 355 persons per km2. The total area is 37.25 km2.

During World War II, manufacturing facilities associated with the Sasebo Naval Arsenal were constructed in Kawatana, leading to a temporary increase in population. The economy of the area is now heavily dependent on agriculture and fishing.

Geography

Surrounding municipalities 

 Nagasaki Prefecture
 Sasebo
 Hasami
 Higashisonogi
 Saga Prefecture
 Ureshino

Education 
Kawatana have a prefectural high school, the Kawatana Prefectural High School (長崎県立川棚高等学校, Nagasaki-kenritsu Kawatana Kōtōgakkō), also known as Kawakō (川高). Meanwhile, the town also have a junior high school and three primary schools. There are also two special aid schools in Kawatana.

Transportation

Railway 

 JR Kyushu
 Ōmura Line: Ogushigō - Kawatana

Highway 
Japan National Route 205 passes through Kawatana.

External links

 Kawatana official website 

Towns in Nagasaki Prefecture